The 2022 Georgia's Rome Tennis Open was a professional tennis tournament played on indoor hard courts. It was the second edition of the tournament which was part of the 2022 ITF Women's World Tennis Tour. It took place in Rome, Georgia, United States between 30 January and 6 February 2022.

Singles main-draw entrants

Seeds

 1 Rankings are as of 17 January 2022.

Other entrants
The following players received wildcards into the singles main draw:
  Emina Bektas
  Robin Montgomery
  Emma Navarro
  Alycia Parks

The following players received entry from the qualifying draw:
  Sophie Chang
  Louisa Chirico
  Dalayna Hewitt
  Katarina Jokić
  Tatjana Maria
  Whitney Osuigwe
  Lulu Sun
  Marcela Zacarías

The following player received entry as a lucky loser:
  Raveena Kingsley

Champions

Singles

  Tatjana Maria def.  Alycia Parks, 6–4, 4–6, 6–2

Doubles

  Sophie Chang /  Angela Kulikov def.  Emina Bektas /  Tara Moore, 6–3, 6–7(2–7), [10–7]

References

External links
 2022 Georgia's Rome Tennis Open at ITFtennis.com
 Official website

2022 ITF Women's World Tennis Tour
2022 in American tennis
January 2022 sports events in the United States
February 2022 sports events in the United States
2022 in sports in Georgia (U.S. state)